One Dark Night is an American film released in 1939. Also known as Night Club Girl. It was directed by Leo C. Popkin. It was produced by Harry M. Popkin. The film features an African American cast including Mantan Moreland in a dramatic role.

Cast
Mantan Moreland
Josephine Pearson
Betty Treadville
Jessie Coles Grayson

Production and release 
Hattie McDaniel reportedly turned down the role played by Bette Treadville. The film was made by Million Dollar Productions and distributed by Sack Amusement Enterprises. It was produced by Clifford Sanforth. The film drew various black celebrities to a showing. Josephine Edwards performs two songs in the lost film.

The film was re-released as Night Club Girl in 1944. It is categorized as a race film, and is now lost. The Yale University Library has a lobby card for the film.

References

External links

1939 films
1930s English-language films
Films directed by Leo C. Popkin
American comedy films
1930s American films